Tadeusz Skarzyński (10 April 1886 – 2 April 1944) was a Polish actor and director. He was active in theatre and film between 1908 and 1939. A resistance member during the Second World War, Skarzyński was arrested by the Gestapo and died in custody in Radom in April 1944.

Select filmography
Sezonowa milosc (1918)
Rozporek i Ska (1918)
Nie damy ziemi, skad nasz ród (1920)

References

External links

1886 births
1944 deaths
People from Kutno
Polish male stage actors
Polish male film actors
20th-century Polish male actors
Polish theatre directors
Polish resistance members of World War II
Polish civilians killed in World War II
Polish people who died in prison custody
Prisoners who died in German detention